Borderline is a British mockumentary television comedy series devised by Michael Orton-Toliver and Chris Gau. Narrated by Ralf Little, the series launched on 2 August 2016 on Channel 5. The series follows the activity of agents working for Borderline, a fictionalised version of the Border Force, at the fictional Northend Airport.

In contrast to most series, which require the cast to memorise a script, Borderline is "retro-scripted": The cast is given a plot outline to guide them as they improvise their dialogue and actions.

As of December 2016, the series is available on Netflix in select regions.

Production
In February 2016, it was announced that Channel 5 had ordered a new comedy series. The news was revealed by Royle Family star Ralf Little.

The first series was filmed at Coventry Airport in March/April 2016.

Series 2
In August 2016, during the first series run it was announced by Ben Frow (Channel 5's Director of Programming) that the show had been commissioned for a second series.

References

External links
 

2016 British television series debuts
2017 British television series endings
2010s British comedy television series
Aviation television series
Channel 5 (British TV channel) original programming
British comedy television shows
English-language television shows
British mockumentary television series
Television shows set in Warwickshire